Kingsbridge Wind Power Project, also referred to as Kingsbridge 1 Wind facility , refers to a large wind farm owned and operated by Capital Power Corporation. Kingsbridge 1 Wind facility is located between Goderich and Kincardine, Ontario. The Kingsbridge 1 Wind facility is located on the southeast shore of Lake Huron in the township of Ashfield-Colborne-Wawanosh and consists of 22 1.8 MW Vestas V80 wind turbines with a capacity of 39.6 MW. Each tower is over 78 meters tall and weigh around 195 metric tonnes. The project consists of two phases and currently provides power to on average 12,500 homes.

In 2004, the first phase was awarded a generation contract by the Government of Ontario as part of its renewable energy RFP. Construction has since been completed and the project is fully operational. 

In 2005, the second phase received a generation contract from the provincial government.

See also

 List of wind farms in Canada.

References

External links 
 EPCOR, the developer.
 Capital Power, the owner and operator.
 Ontario Renewables RFP I.
 Ontario Renewables RFP II.
"Where is my Electricity Coming From at this Hour? (if I lived in Ontario)" (Canadian Nuclear Society, with data from IESO)

Buildings and structures in Huron County, Ontario
Wind farms in Ontario